Georg Friedrich Grüneberg (13 December 1752 – 22 October 1827) in Stettin, Pommerania) was a German organ builder in Stettin.

Life 
Born in Magdeburg, father Philipp Wilhelm Grüneberg was an organ builder in Magdeburg, since 1767 in Białogard in Pomerania. Georg Friedrich learned from his father, as did his brother Johann Wilhelm Grüneberg, who later became an organ builder in Brandenburg an der Havel. Georg Friedrich Grüneberg was an employee of Johann Gottlieb Mehnert in Stettin from about 1779 and took over his workshop in 1782.

His son August Wilhelm Grüneberg took it over in 1824, and his grandson Barnim Grüneberg made it the most important in the Baltic region.

Work (selection) 
Grüneberg is known to have built new organs, changed the disposition, repaired and offered to build new organs. The facade and parts of the organ in Chojnice (Konitz), as well as parts in Poznań.

New organ buildings

Other works

References

Further reading 
 Christhard Kirchner, Uwe Pape: Grüneberg, Georg Friedrich (3). In Uwe Pape, Wolfram Hackel, Christhard Kirchner (ed.): Lexikon norddeutscher Orgelbauer. Band 4. Berlin, Brandenburg und Umgebung. Pape Verlag, Berlin 2017. pp. 190f.

German pipe organ builders
1752 births
1827 deaths
Businesspeople from Magdeburg